The Mercedes-Benz M100 engine was a  single overhead cam V8 produced by Mercedes-Benz between 1963 and 1981. The successor to the M189 version of the company's venerated  straight-6 M186, it was introduced in the flagship Mercedes-Benz 600. In 1968, it was fitted to the high-performance Mercedes-Benz 300SEL 6.3 sports sedan. Mercedes-Benz refers to it as a "6.9", in spite of its actual displacement.

The M100 featured a cast iron block, aluminum alloy heads, and aircraft-style sodium-filled valves operating against hardened valve seats. As in all Mercedes-Benz automobile engines, the crankshaft, connecting rods and pistons were forged instead of cast. 

Each hand-built unit was bench-tested for 265 minutes, 40 of which were under full load. As introduced, it utilized a mechanical fuel injection system designed and built in-house by Daimler-Benz. The  version used a Bosch K-Jetronic Continuous Injection System.

The "6.9"-liter M100 used a "dry sump" engine lubrication system, which both enhanced longevity and reduced overall engine height. Originally developed for racing as a way to prevent engine oil foaming at high crankshaft speeds, which in turn would create a serious drop in oil pressure, it allowed sustained high speeds at full engine power. The M100 system circulated a massive twelve litres of oil through the engine and a storage tank mounted inside the right front fender, as opposed to the usual four or five litres found in V8s with a standard oil pan and oil pump configuration. This, along with hydraulic valve lifters which required no adjusting and special cylinder head gaskets which eliminated the need for periodic retorquing of the head bolts, made the 6.8 nearly maintenance-free for its first .

References

Notes

Bibliography

 

M100
V8 engines
Gasoline engines by model